Queen Maud may refer to:

People
Empress Matilda (1102–1167), Lady of the English
Maud of Wales (1869–1938), Queen of Norway
Maud of Scotland, Queen of England
Matilda of Flanders (1030s–1083), Queen of England
Matilda I of Boulogne, Queen of England & Countess of Boulogne
Matilda II of Boulogne, Queen of Portugal & Countess of Boulogne

Places
Queen Maud Gulf, Canada
Queen Maud Mountains in Antarctica
Queen Maud Land in Antarctica

Other
Queen Maud University College in Trondheim, Norway

See also 
Princess Maud (disambiguation)